This is the discography of American female R&B trio SWV.

Albums

Studio albums

Christmas albums

Compilation albums
The Remixes (1994, RCA)
Greatest Hits (1999, RCA)
Greatest Hits (1999, Simitar)
Best of SWV (2001)
Platinum & Gold Collection (2003)
The Encore Collection (2004)
S.O.U.L. (2011)

Extended plays

Singles

Featured singles

Notes

Album appearances

Music videos

References

Discographies of American artists
Rhythm and blues discographies